María Cristina Rodríguez Torres (born 5 May 1969) is a Spanish costume designer, stylist, actress and television personality. She has been nominated for the Goya Award for Best Costume Design six times for My Heart Goes Boom! (2020), Don't Blame the Karma for Being an Idiot (2016), The Fury of a Patient Man (2016), Por un puñado de besos (2014), Three Many Weddings (2013), and El cónsul de Sodoma (2009). In 2015, she presented the annual New Year's Eve celebration broadcast for Telecinco.

Filmography

As costume designer

As actress

References

External links

 
 

1969 births
Spanish costume designers
People from Alicante
Spanish television actresses
Spanish film actresses
Actresses from Andalusia
20th-century Spanish actresses
21st-century Spanish actresses
Living people